This is a list of members of the 11th Legislative Assembly of Queensland from 1893 to 1896, as elected at the 1893 colonial election held between 18 April 1893 and 25 May 1893 (due to problems of distance and communications, it was not possible to hold the elections on a single day).

See also
Premier:
 Thomas McIlwraith (Ministerialist) (1893)
 Hugh Nelson (Ministerialist) (1893–1898)

Notes
  On 5 November 1893, George Burns, one of the two Ministerialist members for Townsville, died. Labour candidate Anthony Ogden won the resulting by-election held on 20 January 1894.
  On 7 March 1894, John MacFarlane, one of the two Ministerialist members for Ipswich, died. Labour candidate James Wilkinson won the resulting by-election on 31 March 1894.
  On 12 March 1894, John Hoolan, the Labour member for Burke, resigned in order that party leader Thomas Glassey, who had lost his seat at the 1893 election, could re-enter Parliament. Glassey did so at the resulting by-election on 16 June 1894.
  On 17 July 1894, the seat of  Aubigny was declared vacant due to the insolvency of sitting Opposition member William Lovejoy. However, following an arrangement with his creditors, he was again eligible to be a member of parliament and stood for re-election at the resulting by-election on 4 August 1894. However, Opposition candidate William Thorn won the resulting by-election by a narrow margin of 8 votes.
  On 17 July 1894, the seat of Toombul was declared vacant due to the insolvency of sitting Ministerialist member Andrew Lang Petrie. However, following an arrangement with his creditors, he was again eligible to be a member of parliament and was re-elected at the resulting by-election on 4 August 1894.

References

 Waterson, Duncan Bruce: Biographical Register of the Queensland Parliament 1860–1929 (second edition), Sydney 2001.
 

Members of Queensland parliaments by term
19th-century Australian politicians